= Bidaragaddi =

- Village
- Country: India
- State: Karnataka
- District: Belagavi district

Government
  - Type: Panchayat raj

Languages
  - Official: Kannada
- Time zone: UTC+5:30 (IST)
- ISO 3166 code: IN-KA

Bidaragaddi is a village in Belagavi district in the southern state of Karnataka, India. Kannada is the main language spoken in the village
